María del Carmen Serdán Alatriste (1875 in Puebla de Zaragoza, Puebla – August 28, 1948) was a Mexican revolutionary. She shared the ideas of the Mexican Revolution and sympathized with Francisco I Madero. She was the sister of Aquiles Serdán Alatriste, also a revolutionary, and granddaughter of Miguel Cástulo Alatriste Castro, who served as the Liberal governor of the state of Puebla from 1857 to 1861.

Early life
Daughter of the lawyer Manuel Serdán Guanes (1843-1880, editor of the People's Law, the first agrarian reform plan in the country), and María del Carmen Alatriste Cuesta (1849-?), Was sister of Natalia (1875-1938), Aquiles (1877-1910) and Máximo Serdán Alatriste (1879-1910).

Path 
She worked with her brother Aquiles (both belonged to the National Anti-reelectionist Party (later the Progressive Constitutional Party), founded by her and Francisco I. Madero during the campaign in favor of the latter, who opposed the regime of Porfirio Díaz.

The 18 of November 1910, her family residence was attacked by the federal army and was about to be searched by the police chief Miguel Cabrera. The Serdán family resisted, while her brother Maximus barricaded himself on the roof. María del Carmen exhorted the population from a balcony of her house.

She was wounded and captured. She was sent to the prison of La Merced and later to the municipal hospital of San Pedro (see Royal Hospital of San Pedro or Temple of the Ex-Hospital of San Pedro and San Pedro Art Museum). When Victoriano Huerta's term ended, she worked in various hospitals as a nurse. She lived her last years in her hometown and died on August 28, 1948.

She was a contributor to the satirical magazine El Hijo del Ahuizote and the newspaper Diario del Hogar.

Carmen Serdán was one of the few women who spread the Diaz - Creelman interview (es) (which detonated the situation that would end up generating the Mexican Revolution) in gazettes and meetings.

She founded and was part of the Revolutionary Junta de Puebla.

She organized the reception for Francisco I. Madero in Puebla, in the company of a group of women from that city, with whom she carried out anti-reelectionist propaganda actions. Madero proposed to the group a policy of equality in work and pay. The group was joined by Sara Pérez Romero, the candidate's wife. The 20 of November 1910, Carmen Serdán was in charge of the logistics of the revolutionary movement in the state of Puebla state. In those days, she used a code language of her invention and a pseudonym, "Marcos Serrato", to exchange, through several newspapers, messages with her brother Aquiles, who was in San Antonio, Texas. While the men were being watched by the government of Mucio P. Martínez, the women of the so-called Feminine Club were in charge of the war preparations and of spreading the San Luis Plan, which indicated the steps to follow in the armed uprising.

Acknowledgments
In her memory, several schools (kindergartens, primary and secondary), houses of culture, markets, libraries, colonies and sports facilities in Mexico are named after her.

References 

 

1875 births
1948 deaths
19th-century Mexican women
20th-century Mexican women
Mexican revolutionaries
Mexican women in politics
People of the Mexican Revolution
Women in war 1900–1945
Women in war in Mexico